Diffeomorphometry is the metric study of imagery, shape and form in the discipline of computational anatomy (CA) in medical imaging. The study of images in computational anatomy rely on high-dimensional diffeomorphism groups  which generate orbits of the form  , in which images  can be dense scalar magnetic resonance or computed axial tomography images. For deformable shapes these are the collection of manifolds ,  points, curves and surfaces.

The orbit of shapes and forms  is made into a metric space by inducing a metric on the group of diffeomorphisms.  The study of metrics on groups of diffeomorphisms and the study of metrics between manifolds and surfaces has been an area of significant investigation. In Computational anatomy, the diffeomorphometry metric measures how close and far two shapes or images are from each other. Informally, the metric  is constructed by defining a flow of diffeomorphisms  which connect the group elements from one to another, so for  then .  The metric between two coordinate systems or diffeomorphisms is then the shortest length or geodesic flow connecting them. The metric on the space associated to the geodesics is given by. The metrics on the orbits   are inherited from the metric induced on the diffeomorphism group.

The group  is thusly made into a smooth Riemannian manifold with Riemannian metric   associated to the tangent spaces at all . The  Riemannian metric satisfies at every point of the manifold  there is an  inner product inducing the norm  on the tangent space   that varies smoothly across .

Oftentimes, the familiar Euclidean metric is not directly applicable because the patterns of shapes and images don't form a vector space. In the Riemannian orbit model of Computational anatomy, diffeomorphisms acting on the forms  don't act linearly. There are many ways to define metrics, and for the sets associated to shapes the Hausdorff metric is another. The method used to induce the Riemannian metric is to induce the metric on the orbit of shapes by defining it in terms of the metric length between diffeomorphic coordinate system transformations of the flows. Measuring the lengths of the geodesic flow between coordinates systems in the orbit of shapes is called diffeomorphometry.

The diffeomorphisms group generated as Lagrangian and Eulerian flows 

The diffeomorphisms in computational anatomy are generated to satisfy the Lagrangian and Eulerian specification of the flow fields, generated via the ordinary differential equation

The inverse for the flow is given by

and the  Jacobian matrix for flows in   given as 

To ensure smooth flows of diffeomorphisms with inverse,  the vector fields  must be at least 1-time continuously differentiable in space which are modelled as elements of the Hilbert space   using the Sobolev embedding theorems so that each element  has 3-square-integrable derivatives thusly implies  embeds smoothly in 1-time continuously differentiable functions.  The diffeomorphism group are flows with vector fields absolutely integrable in Sobolev norm:

The Riemannian orbit model

Shapes in Computational Anatomy (CA) are studied via the use of diffeomorphic mapping for establishing correspondences between anatomical coordinate systems. In this setting, 3-dimensional medical images are modelled as diffemorphic transformations of some exemplar, termed the template , resulting in the observed images to be elements of the random orbit model of CA.

The Riemannian metric

The orbit of shapes and forms in Computational Anatomy  are generated by the group action  , .   These are made into a Riemannian orbits by introducing a metric associated to each point and associated tangent space. For this a metric is defined on the group which induces the metric on the orbit. Take as the metric for Computational anatomy at each element of the tangent space  in the group of diffeomorphisms

with the vector fields modelled to be in a Hilbert space with the norm in the Hilbert space . We model  as a reproducing kernel Hilbert space (RKHS) defined by a 1-1, differential operator , where  is the dual-space.

When , a vector density, 

The differential operator is selected so that the Green's kernel associated to the inverse is sufficiently smooth so that the vector fields support 1-continuous derivative. The Sobolev embedding theorem arguments were made in demonstrating that 1-continuous derivative is required for smooth flows. The Green's operator generated from the Green's function(scalar case) associated to the differential operator smooths.

For proper choice of  then  is an RKHS with the operator .  The Green's kernels associated to the differential operator smooths since for controlling enough derivatives in the square-integral sense the kernel   is continuously differentiable in both variables implying

The diffeomorphometry of the space of shapes and forms

The right-invariant metric on diffeomorphisms

The metric on the group of diffeomorphisms is defined by the distance as defined on pairs of elements in the group of diffeomorphisms according to
 This distance provides a right-invariant metric of diffeomorphometry, invariant to reparameterization of space since for all ,

The metric on shapes and forms

The distance on images,

The distance on shapes and forms,

The metric on geodesic flows of landmarks, surfaces, and volumes within the orbit

For calculating the metric, the geodesics are a dynamical system, the flow of coordinates  and the control the vector field  related via   The Hamiltonian view

 reparameterizes the momentum distribution  in terms of the Hamiltonian momentum, a Lagrange multiplier  constraining the Lagrangian velocity .accordingly:

The Pontryagin maximum principle gives the Hamiltonian 
The optimizing vector field  with dynamics . Along the geodesic the Hamiltonian is constant:
. The metric distance between coordinate systems connected via the geodesic determined by the induced distance between identity and group element:

Landmark or pointset geodesics

For landmarks, the Hamiltonian momentum

 
with Hamiltonian  dynamics taking the form

 
with

The metric between landmarks 

The dynamics associated to these geodesics is shown in the accompanying figure.

Surface geodesics
For surfaces, the Hamiltonian momentum is defined across the surface has Hamiltonian

 
and dynamics

The metric between surface coordinates

Volume geodesics
For volumes the Hamiltonian

 

with dynamics

  
The metric between volumes

Software for diffeomorphic mapping 
Software suites containing a variety of diffeomorphic mapping algorithms include the following:
 Deformetrica
 ANTS
 DARTEL Voxel-based morphometry(VBM)
 DEMONS
 LDDMM
 StationaryLDDMM

Cloud software 
 MRICloud

References

Computational anatomy
Medical imaging
Geometry
Mathematical analysis
Fluid mechanics
Bayesian estimation
Neuroscience
Neural engineering
Biomedical engineering